Turris garoensis is an extinct species of sea snail, a marine gastropod mollusk in the family Turridae, the turrids.

Description
The length of the shell attains 57 mm.

Distribution
Fossils of this marine species were found in Miocene strata in Assam, India (age range: 23.03 to 15.97 Ma)

References

 P. N. Mukerjee. 1939. Fossil fauna from the Tertiary of Garo Hills, Assam. Palaeontologia Indica 28(1):1-101

garoensis
Gastropods described in 1939